Leofwine Godwinson (c. 1035 – 14 October 1066) was a younger brother of King Harold Godwinson, the fifth son of Earl Godwin.

When the Godwin family was exiled from England in 1051 he went with Harold to Ireland, where they were sheltered and helped by Diarmait mac Máel na mBó, King of Leinster. He would have returned with the rest of the family the following year, but was not present at the death-bed of his father in April 1053.

Following the death of his father in April 1053, the Godwinsons managed to retain their hold on England. Harold inherited the Earldom of Wessex and became second in power only to the king. Leofwine was made Earl of Kent, Essex, Middlesex, Hertford, Surrey and probably Buckinghamshire some time between 1055 and 1057. Together with his brother Gyrth's Earldoms of East Anglia, Cambridgeshire and Oxfordshire the Godwinsons now controlled the entire East England.

He was killed alongside his brothers Harold and Gyrth in the Battle of Hastings.

Leofwine was portrayed by actor Sebastian Breaks in the two-part BBC TV play Conquest (1966), part of the series Theatre 625.

Citations

Sources

External links
 

|-

House of Godwin
1030s births
1066 deaths
11th-century English people
Viking rulers
Anglo-Saxon warriors
Norman conquest of England
Anglo-Saxons killed in battle
Year of birth uncertain